Cold Spring Township may refer to the following places in the United States:

 Cold Spring Township, Shelby County, Illinois
 Cold Spring Township, Pennsylvania

See also

 Coldsprings Township, Michigan
 Coolspring Township (disambiguation)

Township name disambiguation pages